This is a list of the main architectural works in Florence, Italy by period. It also includes buildings in surrounding cities, such as Fiesole. Some structures appear two or more times, since they were built in various styles.

Pre-historic, Greek and Roman periods

Romanesque

Gothic

Renaissance (15th century)

Late Renaissance and Mannerism (16th century)

17th century

Rococo and Habsburg-Lorraine period (18th century - first half of 19th century)

Eclecticism, Empire and Art Nouveau (second-half of 19th century - early 20th century)

Modern and contemporary architecture (20th century)

21st century

Sources
 Guido Zucconi, Firenze, guida all'architettura, Arsenale editrice, Verona, 1995

 01
Florence
Culture in Florence
Florence
Florence